Senator Leftwich may refer to:

Debbe Leftwich (fl. 2000s), Oklahoma State Senate
Keith Leftwich (1954–2003), Oklahoma State Senate